Air Côte d'Ivoire is the flag carrier of Ivory Coast, based in Abidjan. The company succeeded the country's former flag carrier Air Ivoire, which went bankrupt in 2011.

History
Air Côte d'Ivoire had an initial capital of CFAF2.5 billion, majority-owned by the government of Ivory Coast (65%), with the balance held by Air France Finance (20%) and Aérienne de Participation-Côte d'Ivoire (15%), an airline holding company of AKFED.

The airline will have "technical, commercial and operational synergies" with Air Mali and Air Burkina, two other airlines associated with the AKFED.

, it was planned for the new company to have 13 flight captains, 12 first officers and 37 cabin crew. The company projects to have a passenger capacity of 330,000 per year. It carried 253,000 passengers during 2013.

Corporate affairs

Ownership
, the parent entities of the shareholders are:

The Aga Khan Fund for Economic Development was a 15% shareholder until 2013, when it was reported that it would withdraw from Air Côte d'Ivoire. The shareholding was acquired by Golden Road, a consortium of private Ivorian investors, with shareholdings changing following subsequent fundraising.

Business trends
Air Côte d'Ivoire does not appear to publish annual accounts, but some figures have been made available via press reports, interviews and other publications (figures shown for years ending 31 December):

Key people
, Air Côte d'Ivoire CEO or General Manager (Directeur Général) is Laurent Loukou.

Destinations

, the airline had initial plans to operate scheduled services from its hub in Abidjan on a network covering nine international destinations in West and East Africa, although some of them would be flown by sister companies Air Burkina and Air Mali. Cities served with Air Côte d'Ivoire's own aircraft were expected to include Accra, Conakry, Cotonou and Dakar.

, Air Côte d'Ivoire serves the following destinations:

Fleet

Current fleet

, Air Côte d'Ivoire operated the following aircraft:

Fleet strategy
During the 2013 Dubai Air Show, it was announced the carrier placed a conditional order for up to four Bombardier Q400s. African Export-Import Bank will finance 95% of the acquisition. The carrier plans to use one of these aircraft to replace the E-170 on regional services. The first Dash 8-Q400 was delivered in late 2014.

Historical fleet
The airline has operated the following aircraft:
Embraer 170

See also

Airlines of Africa
List of airlines of Ivory Coast

Notes

References

External links
 

Airlines of Ivory Coast
Airlines established in 2012
Government-owned airlines
Companies based in Abidjan
Ivorian companies established in 2012